Lilium pumilum is an Asian species of bulbous plants native to Mongolia, Siberia, the Russian Far East (Amur Krai, Primorye, Khabarovsk), Korea and northern China.

The leaves are slender and grassy. It bears from one to twenty reflexed and nodding flowers, usually red in colour, and which may be spotted with black. The flowers are scented.

Named pumilum (`poo`mill`um) for its small size, compared to other lilies

It may be short lived in cultivation, but tends to last longest in well-drained soils.

In Taiwan, both the flower and bulbs are used as food, as are the other related species: L. brownii var. viridulum, L. lancifolium and L. candidum.

References

External links
Pacific Bulb Society Lilium Asiatic Section P-Z photos of several species

pumilum
Flora of Mongolia
Flora of Siberia
Flora of the Russian Far East
Flora of Korea
Flora of China
Plants described in 1812
Taxa named by Augustin Pyramus de Candolle